Amy Johnston (September 22, 1954 – March 17, 2021) was an American film and television actress and drama coach. She played Mary Lee in the NBC sitcom Brothers and Sisters. As her appearances includes, The Buddy Holly Story, Welcome Back, Kotter, Brothers and Sisters, Rooster: Spurs of Death! (1977), and episode "Angels on the Street" of Charlie's Angels.

Johnston died in West Fork, Arkansas on March 17, 2021, at the age of 66.

Filmography

Film

Television

References

External links 

20th-century American actresses
American film actresses
American television actresses
1954 births
2021 deaths
Place of death missing
Place of birth missing
Date of birth missing
21st-century American women